The following is a list of heads of state of North Korea since its foundation in 1948.

The 1948 constitution did not define a head of state, but with regard to political functions usually performed by the head of state, the Chairman of the Standing Committee of the Supreme People's Assembly could be considered one. Kim Il-sung was, at the time, as Premier, merely the head of government but not of state. As his position grew more stable, he wanted to be recognized as the head of state instead. Foreign admirers first started calling him such, and in the 1972 constitution his position was formalized as the President of the republic. After Kim Il-sung died in 1994, the presidency and hence the position of head of state was left vacant. While the late leader was titled the Eternal President of North Korea, the actual office of the President was written out of the constitution in 1998 making the head of state undefined again. His son and successor, Kim Jong-il, kept official titles given to him by the late president and never formally became the head of state. Titles used by Kim Jong-un have constitutionally defined him as the Supreme Leader, but not formal head of state.

Heads of state of North Korea (1948–present)

Timeline

See also

 Supreme Leader (North Korean title)
 Eternal leaders of North Korea
 General Secretary of the Workers' Party of Korea
 President of North Korea
 Premier of North Korea
 Chairman of the Standing Committee of the Supreme People's Assembly
 President of the State Affairs of North Korea
 Government of North Korea
 Politics of North Korea

References

Heads of state
 
Korea, North
Heads of state
Heads of state
Lists of North Korean people